Marion Kyle Sherman (born October 17, 1925, date of death unknown) was an American politician in the state of Washington. She served the 47th district from 1975 to 1983. Prior to this, Sherman supported the United States war effort as a riveter with Boeing during World War II. She lived in Maple Valley, Washington and was married to Leonard Sherman. Together they had two children. Sherman is deceased.

References

1925 births
Year of death missing
Politicians from Puyallup, Washington
Women state legislators in Washington (state)
Democratic Party members of the Washington House of Representatives
21st-century American women